|}

The Prix Eugène Adam is a Group 2 flat horse race in France open to three-year-old thoroughbreds. It is run at Maisons-Laffitte over a distance of 2,000 metres (about 1 miles), and it is scheduled to take place each year in July.

History
The event was established in 1893, and it was originally called the Prix Monarque. It was named after Monarque, the sire of Gladiateur.

The Prix Monarque was renamed the Prix du Président de la République in 1903. It reverted to its original name when a new Prix du Président de la République (the future Grand Prix de Saint-Cloud) was introduced in 1904.

The race was usually run on Maison-Laffitte's straight track until 1910. For a period thereafter it took place on the venue's right-handed course.

The event was renamed in memory of Eugène Adam (1840–1904), a former president of the Société Sportive d'Encouragement, in 1911. The title Prix Eugène Adam had been previously assigned to what later became the Prix Exbury.

The Prix Eugène Adam was abandoned throughout World War I, with no running from 1915 to 1918. It was cancelled once during World War II, in 1940. It was temporarily switched to Auteuil in 1944, and on this occasion it was contested over 2,100 metres. It was transferred to Saint-Cloud in 1946.

The event returned to Maisons-Laffitte in 1998, and it moved to Deauville in 2000. It began its current spell at Maisons-Laffitte in 2002. It is now subtitled the Grand Prix de Maisons-Laffitte.

Due to the 2019–20 coronavirus pandemic, 2020 Prix Eugène Adam are not run.

Records
Leading jockey (5 wins):
 Yves Saint-Martin – Jour et Nuit (1964), Silver Shark (1966), Quiludi (1971), Citheron (1972), Crow (1976)

Leading trainer (14 wins):
 André Fabre – Mourjane (1983), Cariellor (1984), Courtroom (1985), Un Desperado (1986), Sarhoob (1988), River Warden (1989), Arcangues (1991), Carnegie (1994), Radevore (1996), Kirkwall (1997), Sobieski (2000), Valixir (2004), Archange d'Or (2005), Triple Threat (2013)

Leading owner (7 wins):
 Marcel Boussac – Banstar (1926), Negundo (1933), Micipsa (1943), Goyama (1946), Sandjar (1947), Cordova (1954), Anaram (1960)

Winners since 1980

 Desert Boy finished first in 1996, but he was relegated to third place following a stewards' inquiry.

Earlier winners

 1893: Saint Ferjeux
 1894: Ravioli
 1895: Merlin
 1896: Sheridan
 1897: Vidame
 1898: Monfaucon
 1899: Fourire
 1900: Codoman
 1901: Lady Killer
 1902: Exema
 1903: Alpha
 1904: Gouvernant
 1905: Val d'Or
 1906: Maintenon
 1907: Biniou
 1908: Magellan
 1909: Chulo
 1910: Marsa
 1911: Gavarni
 1912: Amoureux
 1913: Blarney
 1914: Sardanapale
 1915–18: no race
 1919: Cesaire
 1920: Petit Palais
 1921: Guerriere
 1922: Gaurisankar
 1923: Checkmate
 1924: Canape
 1925: Ptolemy
 1926: Banstar
 1927: Queen Iseult
 1928: Guy Fawkes
 1929: Argonaute
 1930: Potiphar
 1931: Ilex
 1932: Gris Perle
 1933: Negundo
 1934: Astronomer
 1935: Vignes du Seigneur
 1936: Don Milo
 1937: Teleferique
 1938: Patoche
 1939: Ati
 1940: no race
 1941: Kourtchi
 1942: Good Admiral
 1943: Micipsa
 1944: Coadjuteur
 1945: Achille
 1946: Goyama
 1947: Sandjar
 1948:
 1949: Bahadur Fair
 1950: Ksarinor
 1951: Mat de Cocagne
 1952: Fine Top
 1953: Xacam
 1954: Cordova
 1955: Beau Prince
 1956: Chateau Latour
 1957: Balbo
 1958: Speedway
 1959: Memorandum
 1960: Anaram
 1961: Star
 1962: Trac
 1963: Corpora
 1964: Jour et Nuit
 1965: Trictrac
 1966: Silver Shark
 1967: Saint Leonard
 1968: Timmy My Boy
 1969: Hitchcock
 1970: Highest Hopes
 1971: Quiludi
 1972: Citheron
 1973: Rose Laurel
 1974: Mannsfeld
 1975: Free Round
 1976: Crow
 1977: Casaque
 1978: Gay Mecene
 1979: Planing

See also
 List of French flat horse races
 Recurring sporting events established in 1893 – this race is included under its original title, Prix Monarque.

References

 France Galop / Racing Post:
 galop.courses-France.com:
 1893–1919, 1920–1949, 1950–1979, 1980–present
 france-galop.com – A Brief History: Prix Eugène Adam.
 galopp-sieger.de – Prix Eugène Adam (ex Prix Monarque).
 horseracingintfed.com – International Federation of Horseracing Authorities – Prix Eugène Adam (2016).
 pedigreequery.com – Prix Eugène Adam – Maisons-Laffitte.

Flat horse races for three-year-olds
Maisons-Laffitte Racecourse
Horse races in France